Bill Wentworth (born c. 1958)  is a retired American football player and coach. He served as the head football coach at Denison University in Granville, Ohio from 1993 to 1999, compiling a record of 23–46–1. He was an assistant coach at the University of Washington and a member of the 1991 national championship team.

Head coaching record

References

Year of birth missing (living people)
1950s births
Living people
Cal State Fullerton Titans football coaches
Denison Big Red football coaches
Idaho Vandals football coaches
Indiana Hoosiers football coaches
LSU Tigers football coaches
Purdue Boilermakers football coaches
Washington Huskies football coaches
Purdue University alumni